The Tilia Slovenia Open is a professional tennis tournament played on outdoor hard courts in Portorož, Slovenia with 1st edition on 2013. It is currently part of the ATP Challenger Tour. It is held on courts of the Sports-Recreational center Marina Portorož at Tennis club Portorož.

Finals

Singles

Doubles

External links
Official website
Live Webcam Panorama on Centre Court in Portorož, Slovenia

 
ATP Challenger Tour
Hard court tennis tournaments
Tennis tournaments in Slovenia